Evelyn Padin (born 1960) is an American lawyer from New Jersey who is serving as a United States district judge of the United States District Court for the District of New Jersey.

Education 

Padin was born in 1960 in Jersey City, New Jersey. She received her Bachelor of Arts from Rutgers University in 1983, her Master of Social Work from Fordham University in 1985, and her Juris Doctor from Seton Hall University in 1992. Between college and law school, from 1985 until 1989, Padin worked as a social worker in New York and New Jersey.

Legal career 

Padin started her career as an associate  at Linares & Coviello in Bloomfield, New Jersey, from 1992 to 1994. In 1995, she founded her own practice and was the senior managing partner of the Law Offices of Evelyn Padin, where her focus was on criminal defense and personal injury law. Padin served as a municipal court judge in Jersey City in 1998.

Federal judicial service 

On November 3, 2021, President Joe Biden announced his intent to nominate Padin to serve as a United States district judge of the United States District Court for the District of New Jersey. On December 15, 2021, her nomination was sent to the Senate. President Biden nominated Padin to the seat vacated by Judge Faith S. Hochberg, who assumed senior status on March 6, 2015. Padin was recommended by Senator Robert Menendez. On March 2, 2022, a hearing on her nomination was held before the Senate Judiciary Committee. On April 4, 2022, her nomination was reported out of committee by a 12–10 vote. On May 24, 2022, the United States Senate invoked cloture on her nomination by a 52–39 vote. On May 25, 2022, her nomination was confirmed by a 51–43 vote. She received her judicial commission on June 24, 2022. She is the second Latina federal judge for the District of New Jersey.

Memberships 

Padin served as the president of the New Jersey State Bar Association from 2019 to 2020. She was the first Puerto Rican and Latina to serve in this role. She also previously served as a trustee to the Hispanic Bar Association of New Jersey and on the Board of Governors for the New Jersey Association for Justice.

References

External links 
 

1960 births
Living people
20th-century American women lawyers
20th-century American lawyers
20th-century American judges
21st-century American judges
21st-century American lawyers
21st-century American women lawyers
21st-century American women judges
Fordham University alumni
Hispanic and Latino American judges
Hispanic and Latino American lawyers
Judges of the United States District Court for the District of New Jersey
New Jersey lawyers
People from Jersey City, New Jersey
Rutgers University alumni
Seton Hall University School of Law alumni
United States district court judges appointed by Joe Biden
20th-century American women judges